Tom Lebbon (born 16 May 2005) is a British racing driver set to race in the 2023 Formula Regional European Championship with Arden Motorsport. He was the champion of the 2020 Ginetta Junior Championship and finished third in the 2022 GB3 Championship.

Career

Karting 
Lebbon started competing in national karting competitions in 2016. The Brit would stay in karts until 2019, when he finished second to Joshua McLean in the LGM Series.

Ginetta Junior Championship 
After racing in the Ginetta Junior Winter Championship at the end of 2019, Lebbon signed up to race for Elite Motorsport in the 2020 Ginetta Junior Championship. Despite being a series rookie, Lebbon won five races, four of which he won consecutively, and won the title with a nine-point gap to the experienced Josh Rattican. Through that he became the first ever driver to win the overall championship whilst being classed as a rookie.

GB3 Championship

2021 
For 2021, Lebbon elected to skip Formula 4, the standard entry point for upstarting single-seater drivers, and re-joined Elite Motorsport in the GB3 Championship, partnering Javier Sagrera and José Garfias. The Brit enjoyed a strong debut campaign, as he regularly finished in the top ten in races and even scored his first podium in the reversed-grid race at Donington Park.

2022 
Lebbon remained with Elite Motorsport for the 2022 GB3 Championship.

Formula Regional 
Lebbon made the step up to the Formula Regional European Championship in 2023, teaming up with Arden Motorsport.

Karting record

Karting career summary

Racing record

Racing career summary 

* Season still in progress.

Complete Ginetta Junior Championship results 
(key) (Races in bold indicate pole position) (Races in italics indicate fastest lap)

Complete GB3 Championship results 
(key) (Races in bold indicate pole position) (Races in italics indicate fastest lap)

Complete Formula Regional European Championship results 
(key) (Races in bold indicate pole position) (Races in italics indicate fastest lap)

References

External links 

 

2005 births
Living people
British racing drivers
BRDC British Formula 3 Championship drivers
Ginetta Junior Championship drivers
Formula Regional European Championship drivers
Arden International drivers